Apache Rose is a 1947 American Trucolor Western film directed by William Witney and starring Roy Rogers. It was the first Roy Rogers Western shot in the process though most copies on DVD are in monochrome.

Plot
When oil is discovered on a Vegas ranch, Mexican gambler Carlos is in a deadly fight with his enemies for the oil, putting his girlfriend (Dale Evans) at risk as well as his female cousin whom the bad guys shoot in the arm. His girlfriend then masquerades as his wounded cousin narrowly missing getting killed but cowboy hero Roy Rogers catches wind of the plot and rescues Dale aka Carlos' cousin. Eventually the bad guys are brought to justice after a tense battle on the seashore with guns and fists.

Cast
 Roy Rogers as Roy Rogers
 Trigger as Trigger, Roy's Horse
 Dale Evans as Billie Colby
 Olin Howland as Alkali Elkins
 George Meeker as Reed Calhoun
 John Laurenz as Henchman Pete
 Russ Vincent as Carlos Vega
 Minerva Urecal as Felicia
 LeRoy Mason as Henchman Hilliard
 Donna Martell as Rosa Vega
 Terry Frost as Sheriff Jim Mason
 Conchita Lemus as Dancer
 Tex Terry as Henchman Likens
 Bob Nolan as Bob
 Sons of the Pioneers as Musicians

Soundtrack 
 Sons of the Pioneers - "Apache Rose" (Written by John Elliott)
 Roy Rogers and chorus - "Ride Vaqueros" (Written by John Elliott)
 Dale Evans and the Sons of the Pioneers - "José" (Written by Glenn Spencer and Tim Spencer)
 Roy Rogers - "At the Wishing Well" (Written by John Elliott)
 Dale Evans - "There's Nothing Like Coffee in the Morning" (Written by John Elliott)

External links 
 
 

1947 films
1947 Western (genre) films
American Western (genre) films
1940s English-language films
Republic Pictures films
Trucolor films
Films directed by William Witney
1940s American films